Alloush is a surname. Notable people with the surname include:

Fadi Alloush (born 1969), Lebanese footballer
 Kinda Alloush  (born 1982), Syrian actress
Zahran Alloush (1971–2015), Syrian rebel military leader